Stephen Douglas Wycoff (September 16, 1903 – October 27, 1981) was an American football running back for the New York Giants, Staten Island Stapletons, and Boston Redskins in the National Football League (NFL), the Newark Bears in the first American Football League (AFL), and the Boston Shamrocks in the second American Football League. He played college football at Georgia Tech, where he was a running back and senior captain.

Georgia Tech
Wycoff prepped in Little Rock, Arkansas, and came to Tech as a package deal with Ike Williams. He was the school's first letterman in four sports.

Football

Wycoff was a prominent fullback for Bill Alexander's Georgia Tech Yellow Jackets football team from 1923 to 1925. He was elected captain of the 1925 team, having been "the outstanding back of the South for the past two years." Coach Alexander recalled "The work of Douglas Wycoff against Notre Dame two years in succession was brilliant in the extreme, as was his plunging against Penn. State when we defeated them twice." He was a consensus All-Southern choice each year he played. Lawrence Perry selected Wycoff first-team All-American in 1924.

Morgan Blake, sports writer for the Atlanta Journal, said of an all-time All-Southern list: "It seems to us that one name is left out in this collection, who may have been the best all-around player the South has had.

"We have reference to Doug Wycoff of Tech who, for three straight years, was practically the unanimous all-Southern football choice, despite the fact that Georgia Tech had very lean years during his period of play at this institution. If Wycoff had been flanked by such a pair of halfbacks as Red Barron and Buck Flowers, or Thomason and Mizell while he was with the Jackets, he would have been an all-American. As it was he had to carry all of the offensive load and on the defense he was a wheelhorse. He was a great punter and passer. If Wycoff was not the best all-around player the South had produced then he was very close to the peak."

Professional football

Newark Bears
Wycoff scored the Newark Bears only points in their short existence, having a touchdown run and kicking the extra point to tie the Chicago Bulls in both teams’ opening game of the season.

Miami Seahawks
He was one time part owner of the Miami Seahawks.

Wrestling
Wycoff also wrestled. He once beat former Florida Gators fullback Bill Middlekauff in a match, the main event at the Atlanta Municipal Auditorium for Georgia Championship Wrestling promoter Henry Weber.

Championships and accomplishments
NWA Florida
NWA Florida Heavyweight Championship (1 time)

References

External links 

 

1903 births
1981 deaths
American football running backs
Boston Redskins players
Georgia Tech Yellow Jackets football players
Newark Bears (AFL) players
New York Giants players
Staten Island Stapletons coaches
Staten Island Stapletons players
All-Southern college football players
Players of American football from St. Louis
American male sport wrestlers
20th-century professional wrestlers
NWA Florida Heavyweight Champions